Luis María Lasúrtegui Berridi (born 28 March 1956 in Pasaia, Guipúzcoa) is a Spanish competition rower and Olympic champion.

He won a silver medal in the coxless pair event at the 1984 Summer Olympics in Los Angeles, together with Fernando Climent.

See also
List of Basques

Notes

References

External links
 
 
 
 
 
 

1956 births
Living people
Spanish male rowers
Olympic rowers of Spain
Olympic silver medalists for Spain
Olympic medalists in rowing
Rowers at the 1980 Summer Olympics
Rowers at the 1984 Summer Olympics
Rowers at the 1988 Summer Olympics
Medalists at the 1984 Summer Olympics
World Rowing Championships medalists for Spain
People from Pasaia
Sportspeople from Gipuzkoa
Rowers from the Basque Country (autonomous community)
20th-century Spanish people